Nasir Iqbal (born April 1, 1994 in Bannu) is a squash player who represents Pakistan. He won the prestigious British Junior Open Under-13 category in 2007 by defeating Fadi Tharwat in 41 minutes. He reached a career-high world ranking of World No. 35 in February 2016. He won President Gold Cup International Squash Championship, 2015 beating Todd Harrity.

References

External links
  (archive 3)
 

1994 births
Living people
Pakistani male squash players
Asian Games competitors for Pakistan
Squash players at the 2014 Asian Games
South Asian Games gold medalists for Pakistan
South Asian Games medalists in squash
People from Bannu District
Pashtun people